Patrick Pons (24 December 1952 in Paris - 10 August 1980) was a French professional Grand Prix motorcycle road racer. His best year was in 1974 when he finished in third place in the 250cc and the 350cc world championships. Pons became the first Frenchman to win an F.I.M. world championship when he won the 1979 Formula 750 title. 

In 1980, he won the prestigious Daytona 200. He was killed in a racing accident at the 1980 British Grand Prix.

Grand Prix motorcycle racing results 

Points system from 1969 onwards:

(key) (Races in bold indicate pole position; races in italics indicate fastest lap)

References

External links 

 

1952 births
1980 deaths
Sportspeople from Paris
French motorcycle racers
250cc World Championship riders
350cc World Championship riders
500cc World Championship riders
Motorcycle racers who died while racing
Sport deaths in England
Burials at Montmartre Cemetery
Filmed deaths in motorsport